SUNY Oswego CDP is a census-designated place (CDP) covering the State University of New York at Oswego campus in Oswego County, New York, United States. It covers the permanent resident population of the campus and is not reflective of either the student body or include students who list their permanent residency elsewhere.

Per the 2020 census, the population was 3,451.

Demographics

2020 census

Note: the US Census treats Hispanic/Latino as an ethnic category. This table excludes Latinos from the racial categories and assigns them to a separate category. Hispanics/Latinos can be of any race.

References

Census-designated places in Oswego County, New York